Kiss: Psycho Circus: The Nightmare Child is a first-person shooter video game developed by American studio Third Law Interactive and published by Gathering of Developers for Microsoft Windows in July 2000. It was also released later that year for Dreamcast (using Windows CE) following a port by Tremor Entertainment.

Gameplay
The game is based on Todd McFarlane's Kiss: Psycho Circus series of comic books, themselves inspired by the rock band Kiss.

The game's story revolves around a Kiss tribute band, who suddenly receive superhuman powers.

Publication history
Kiss: Psycho Circus was the first game to be developed by Third Law Interactive, themselves having recently formed in December 1998 after a widely publicized mass walkout from Ion Storm. Versions for PlayStation and Game Boy Color were planned, but were later canceled. The PC version of the game was done on an enhanced version of the Lithtech engine, licensed from Monolith Productions. The PC version was also distributed with the November edition of Computer Buyer in 2000.

The game was exhibited during E3 1999 at Gathering of Developers' booth across the street from the event; alongside booth babes and live music, dwarves dressed as members of Kiss promoted the game.

Reception

The game received "mixed or average reviews" on both platforms according to the review aggregation website Metacritic. However, Jeff Lundrigan of NextGen said of the PC version, "To be fair, this title accomplishes what it set its sights to do. Trouble is, those sights weren't set very high. This will seem interesting only if the last game you ever played was Doom."

Kevin "BIFF Giacobbi of GameZone gave the PC version nine out of ten, saying, "THIS GAME ROCKS! What I am most pleased with is the support that the web site offers. Not only is there a forum where gamers can post games and ask questions that the KPC staff can answer as well as fellow gamers. But let's go one step further. There is a live chat session between certain hours where you can ask questions via chat with some of the KPC staff…WAY IMPRESSED! Other games should follow this idea!" However, Edge gave it three out of ten, saying, "A lot like Kiss themselves, The Nightmare Child is comically frightening and utterly over the top. Just as aptly, underneath all the irony, make-up and gothic ramblings, it isn't really worth the effort."

The PC version and its Collector's Edition sold 42,000 units in the U.S. by October 2001. The Dreamcast version in the U.S. sold 34,453 units.

References

External links

2000 video games
Band-centric video games
Cancelled Game Boy Color games
Cancelled PlayStation (console) games
Cultural depictions of Kiss (band)
Dreamcast games
First-person shooters
Gathering of Developers games
Horror video games
Kiss (band) video games
LithTech games
Video games based on musicians
Take-Two Interactive games
Video games based on comics
Video games based on Image Comics
Video games developed in the United States
Windows games
Multiplayer and single-player video games